Antoine-Joseph Duc (11 May 1856 – April 1934), known as Duc-Quercy and sometimes called Albert Duc-Quercy, was a French journalist and militant socialist.
He was involved in several strikes in the coal mining areas of Aveyron.
He twice ran unsuccessfully for election to the legislature as  socialist.

Career

Antoine-Joseph Duc was born in 1856.
He was a native of Arles, and as a young man was a Provençal poet.
He taught French to his fellow-Provençal Batisto Bonnet, who said later Duc-Quercy "looked like a small black bull breathing fire from mouth and nostrils."
In 1877 the Soucieta Felibrenco dé Paris was founded by Baptiste Bonnet, Jean Barnabé Amy, Joseph Banquier, Antoine Duc (Duc-Quercy), Maurice Faure, Louis Gleize and Pierre Grivolas. The society created the journal Lou Viro-Souléu.

Literary activity

Duc-Quercy became a journalist, a member of the French Workers' Party and of the French Section of the Workers' International.
He contributed to Paul Lafargue's La Socialiste, the organ of the Guesdist movement.
In 1887 the paper was at risk of closing, and Duc-Quercy, Lafarge and  Jules Guesde went to Marseille in an attempt to expand circulation.
Gabriel Deville donated funds from an inheritance, which kept the paper alive until early February 1888, when it ceased publication until September 1890.

Duc-Quercy was the editor of the Cri du peuple.
When interviewing Maurice Maeterlinck in 1891 he said he was opposed to literary writers who "voluntarily isolate themselves, on the pretext of pure art, from the ideas of their time".
In Jean Béraud's painting La Madeleine chez le Pharisien (1891) each character is a member of the political or literary world. 
The face of Christ is that of Duc-Quercy and the face of Simon the Pharisee is that of the writer Ernest Renan.
His wife, who wrote under the name "Angèle Duc-Quercy", was also a journalist.
She was sentenced to two months in prison in 1891 for having arranged the escape of the Polish nihilist Stanislas Padlewski (1857–91).
She contributed to La Revue des revues in 1899.

The first issue of the Marxist journal L'Ère Nouvelle ("The New Era") appeared on 1 July 1893, founded and edited by the Guesdist George Diamandy, with the declared purpose of infusing literature with a message of revolutionary socialism.
Contributors included Georgi Plekhanov, Edward Aveling and Gabriel Deville.
Georges Sorel joined the editorial staff.
Other contributors were Abel Hovelacque, Jean Jaurès, Alexandre Millerand, Lafargue, Guesde and Duc-Quercy.
The journal openly provoking the reading public to explore the work of Émile Zola, attacked the "reactionary" critics and also proudly called itself "eclectic".

Political activity

A strike began on 26 January 1886 in Decazeville, Aveyron department. among the workers of the Société des Houllères et Fonderies de l'Aveyron.
It lasted 108 days and drew national attention. The engineer Watrin was thrown out of a window and died.
Duc-Quercy went to Decazeville to support the strike and to draw national attention to the social issues in his Cri de peuple.
Ernest Roche of the Intransigeant also went, as did the socialist politicians Zéphyrin Camélinat, Clovis Hugues and Antide Boyer.
Duc-Quercy and Ernest Roche were charged by the police.
As reported by The Living Age, 

The miners of the Compagnie minière de Carmaux held a stormy meeting on 15 August 1892. 
The strike began the next day and would drag out for ten weeks.
Collections were organized to support the miners, whose determination, solidarity and discipline was widely admired by ordinary people.
Duc-Quercy and the politicians Pierre Baudin, Alexandre Millerand, René Viviani, and Alfred Léon Gérault-Richard often spoke in Carmaux during the strike.
Jean Jaurès, Duc-Quercy and Eugène Baudin said the strike was an attempt to guarantee the political liberties of Carmaux voters.
Paul Lafargue of the French Workers' Party saw it as part of the wider "political and economic battle against the bourgeoisie".
In 1893 Duc-quercy was candidate for the legislative elections for Decazeville, but was not elected.

On 30 August 1902 another strike began in Decazeville, and spread to Aubin, Cransac and the metallurgical works.
The miners found themselves isolated because they were not supported by miners in other basins or by politicians they asked for help such as Guesde and Duc-Quercy.
The strike was suppressed on 19 October 1902.
When Duc-Quercy ran again as candidate for Decazeville in the elections of 1906 he only obtained 1,835 votes.
The poor showing could be attributed to dissension in the local socialist movement after the 1902 strikes.

Antoine-Joseph Duc died in 1934.

Notes

Sources

 

 

1856 births
1934 deaths
French journalists